Mano Po is a 2002 Filipino drama film produced by Regal Entertainment, and an entry to the 2002 Metro Manila Film Festival. The film focuses on the lives of the Chinese Filipino community. Mano Po stars an all-star cast headed by Maricel Soriano, Richard Gomez, Kris Aquino and Ara Mina. Eddie Garcia and Boots Anson-Roa play the patriarch and matriarch of the Go clan respectively.

The film won the most major awards in the film-awarding bodies, including 12 awards in the 28th Manila Film Festival in 2002. It was named Best Picture, Best Actor (for Eddie Garcia), Best Actress (for Ara Mina), Best Supporting Actress (for Kris Aquino) and Best Director (for Joel Lamangan). Mano Po was among the top-grossing films in time for the Metro Manila Filmfest.

The film's success was followed by a sequel, Mano Po 2: My Home and a spin-off, Bahay Kubo: A Pinoy Mano Po! that was released in 2007. The film was the first entry into what would become a franchise.

Plot
 
Richelle and Raf narrate on a videotape the history of her family. Don Luis Go is a Chinese immigrant who married a Filipina named Elisa. In 1949, the young Luis brought Elisa to China. There Elisa suffered discrimination and misunderstanding from Luis' parents. She decides to go back to the Philippines and Luis joins her. Luis became a cook and Elisa a laundrywoman. Their hard work pays off and they become one of the most prominent Chinese businessmen in the country. The film then shows the challenges they face in old age set simultaneously with the struggles faced by their children and grandchildren in adulthood.

In the present day, the elderly Gos celebrate their wedding anniversary when they are interrupted by their granddaughter Richelle, a delinquent who scandalizes them by wearing revealing clothes, bringing her disreputable boyfriend as a guest and giving them a porn video as a present. Richelle is later arrested on drug charges by authorities led by Raf, who convinces Richelle to turn witness in return for withholding the news of her arrest from her family. Richelle is scorned by the family after she names a family friend as a major drug dealer and her delayed arrival at Elisa's deathbed. Later, Richelle and her sister Juliet are abducted and her other sister Vera's fiancé Emerson  is killed. Raf, who develops a romantic relationship with Richelle, rescues her, but Richelle is shot while shielding Juliet and nearly dies. Upon her recovery Richelle reconciles with her family, who give their blessing to her relationship with Raf and to their marriage. The film ends with a presentation of famous Chinese Filipinos in history.

Cast

Main cast
Maricel Soriano as Vera Go
Kris Aquino as Juliet Go-Co
Richard Gomez as PInsp. Rafael "Raf" Bala
Ara Mina as Richelle Go-Bala

Supporting cast
Eddie Garcia as Don Luis Go
Tirso Cruz III as Daniel Go
Eric Quizon as Joseph Co
Cogie Domingo as young Luis/Fong Huan
Jay Manalo as Emerson Lau
Gina Alajar as Gina Chua-Go
Amy Austria as Linda Go-De la Madrid
Boots Anson-Roa as Elisa Malimban-Go
Maxene Magalona as young Elisa

Minor cast
Allan Paule as Antonio "Tonyo" De la Madrid
Jim Pebanco as Mike De la Madrid
Richard Quan as Joey Yang
Carlo Maceda as Jimmy Go
Nanding Josef as Gen. Dioscoro Blanco

Awards

See also
Mano Po (Filipino film series)
Mano Po 2
Mano Po III: My Love
Ako Legal Wife
Mano Po 5: Gua Ai Di
Bahay Kubo: A Pinoy Mano Po!
Mano Po 6: A Mother's Love
Mano Po 7: Tsinoy

References

External links

2002 films
2002 drama films
Regal Entertainment films
Philippine drama films
Films directed by Joel Lamangan